Bonaparte Provincial Park is an 11,811 hectare provincial park in British Columbia, Canada. It is located within the Bonaparte Plateau.

History 
The park was established April 30, 1996 under the Kamloops Land and Resource Management Plan (LRMP) through the Environment and Land Use Act.

First nations use of the land is not well known.  More recently it had been used as a ranchland by settlers and for fly in tourism.  Prior to the development of the park a moratoria had been placed on timber harvesting in the area in 1974.

Geology 
The park has many small hills formed by lava flow.  This has led to the over 50 small interconnected lakes located within the park.

Geography 
The park is located 55 kilometers northwest of Kamloops.  Motorized vehicle access is most easily obtained via Jamieson Creek Road.

Park Boundaries 
The Southern boundary of the park is formed by the Hiakwah-Shelley Lake chain.  To the east are tree farm license lands.  To the north and west are Provincial Forest lands.

Ecology 
The park contains sub-alpine forest, small lakes and wetlands at high elevation.  There are no known threatened species within the park.  Cattle grazing is permitted within the park.

Recreation 
There is no access within the park to motorized vehicles though snowmobile use is permitted in the southern portion.  The park can also be accessed by floatplane and there are fly in fishing lodges.  Horses are also permitted.  All camping and hiking in the park is in the backcountry without any regular service or parks patrol.  Seasonal hunting is permitted.

See also
Lac du Bois Grasslands Protected Area

References

External links

Provincial parks of British Columbia
Geography of the Cariboo
1996 establishments in British Columbia